Safa Mosque or  Safa Shahouri Mosque is a mosque located at Ponda within Goa, India. It is a sixteenth century Islamic Monument. The mosque has a complex consisting of garden and fountains. The terracotta tile roof accommodates a rectangular prayer hall. It is an ASI protected Monument of National Importance in Goa.

History

According to V.T. Gune, the mosque was built in 1560 by the Bijapuri ruler Ibrahim Adil Shah I about 2 km from center of Ponda. The mosque may be datable to the Adil shah period or even earlier. However, as the mosque doesn't bear any inscription nor is there historical records that mention its construction, the exact date is unknown. During Portuguese rule over Goa, the mosque was damaged and burned by the Portuguese. The mosque was left in ruins until it was partially reconstructed in the 1980s.

References

Mosques in Goa
Buildings and structures in North Goa district